The Peoples Political Party, abbreviated as The People, is a minor political party in the Canadian province of Ontario founded in 2011 by perennial candidate Kevin Clarke.

Platform

The platform of The Peoples Party is largely populist, with the party accusing the three major parties of having economic policies that benefit themselves and an elite minority rather than the province as a whole. The main goal of the party is to ensure that "the day to day needs of all in this city and province" are accommodated. The party suggests that it "will focus on the service of government with people-oriented processes, supporting the needs of humanity", and it supports youth initiatives and employment in addition to increased investment in culture, including the arts, sports, and tourism.

Name dispute with the People's Party of Canada 
In 2021, there were attempts by the federal People's Party of Canada (PPC) to register the name "People's Party of Ontario" with Elections Ontario. The elections agency rejected the name five times due to its similarity to the existing Peoples Political Party. In March 2021, the PPC and Clarke discussed Clarke relinquishing his rights to the name in exchange for running under the PPC banner. The discussions, while initially productive, later broke down after Clarke posted about the matter on social media and added other people to his email conversations with the PPC, with the PPC asking for the posts to be deleted, and Clarke questioning the motives of the PPC, saying "Hold it, you’re supposed to be the People’s Party, and you want to keep things away from the people?" in an interview with the Toronto Star.

Election results

The party failed to win any seats in the 2022 Ontario general election. 

In the 2011 Ontario general election, the Peoples Political Party nominated four candidates for the Legislative Assembly of Ontario:

The party nominated candidates in the 6 September 2012 by-elections in Vaughan and Kitchener—Waterloo for the Legislative Assembly of Ontario.

The party nominated candidates in the 13 February 2014 by-elections in Niagara Falls and Thornhill for the Legislative Assembly of Ontario.

The Peoples Political Party nominated several candidates in the 2018 Ontario general election for the Legislative Assembly of Ontario.

External links

References

Populist parties
Provincial political parties in Ontario
Political parties established in 2011
2011 establishments in Ontario